Live on Morning Becomes Eclectic is a 1998 promo EP by Remy Zero recorded live on KCRW for Morning Becomes Eclectic. The interview conducted by Nic Harcourt.

Track listing

Credits
Artwork By – Mary Ann Dibbs 
A&R – Tony Berg 
Management – Richard Brown/Industry Entertainment 
Photography – Korinne Day 
Written By – Remy Zero

References
Item Information

1998 EPs
1998 live albums
Live EPs
Remy Zero albums